Bangladesh Lekhak Shibir is a Bangladeshi  literary and cultural organisation founded in 1972.

History
Bangladesh Lekhak Shibir was established in 1970 as Lekhak Sangram Shibir by liberal Bengali writers Ahmed Sharif, Humayun Kabir, Sardar Fazlul Karim, Ahmed Sofa, and Serajul Islam Choudhury. It was renamed to Bangladesh Lekhak Shibir in 1972. In 1976 the organisation expanded to include dancers, painters, singers, and cultural activists. The organisation helped establish the cultural organisations collective 'Ganotantrik Sanskritik Front' (Democratic Cultural Front).

References

1972 establishments in Bangladesh
Organisations based in Dhaka
Cultural organisations based in Bangladesh